Elbern H. "Eddie" Alkire (December 6, 1907 – January 25, 1981) was America's most recognized performer, teacher, and innovator of the twentieth-century Hawaiian guitar. Born and raised in rural West Virginia Alkire utilized his skills as a guitarist and musician to become a teacher and composer for Oahu Music Company in October 1929 after having traveled to Pittsburgh to study electrical machines as an employee for a West Virginia coal company. He became music director for the Oahu Serenaders which performed on over 1000 coast-to-coast broadcasts for NBC and CBS that aired from Cleveland, Ohio during the first years of network radio. In 1934 Alkire started his own company in Easton, Pennsylvania to publish music and teach the guitar. He utilized his knowledge of electricity to create the first 10-string electric Hawaiian guitar and his music background to create new tunings that enabled him to play four-part harmonies and rapid melodic passages that became the hallmark of his new style of performance. In 1983 he was inducted into the Steel Guitar Hall of Fame.

A collection of Alkire's original and published music, correspondence, and musical instruments, including four prototype Hawaiian guitars is housed at the Sousa Archives and Center for American Music at the University of Illinois at Urbana-Champaign.

References

1907 births
1981 deaths
People from Webster County, West Virginia
Steel guitarists
20th-century American guitarists
Guitarists from West Virginia
American male guitarists
20th-century American male musicians